Thomas Fagan may refer to:
 Thomas Fagan (psychologist)
 Thomas Fagan (priest)